The 30th Aircraft Carrier Squadron  also called Thirtieth Aircraft Carrier Squadron was a military formation of Escort Aircraft Carriers of the Royal Navy that was part of the British Pacific Fleet from January to August 1945.

History
The 30th Aircraft Carrier Squadron was established in January 1945 with Commodore William. P. Carne taking command in March 1945. the 30th Aircraft Carrier Squadron (30 ACS), consisted of nine escort carriers and was solely assigned to the British Pacific Fleet. From March to April 1945 it was the fleets Air Train.

Administration

Commodore, Commanding, 30th Aircraft Carrier Squadron
Included:

Composition
Included:

: 30th Aircraft Carrier Squadron; British Pacific Fleet January to August 1945

References

Sources
 Drury, Tony. "A History of H.M.S. STRIKER". royalnavyresearcharchive.org.uk. T. Drury. 11 May 2017. 
 Hobbs, David (2012). The British Pacific Fleet: The Royal Navy's Most Powerful Strike Force. Barnsley, England: Seaforth Publishing. .
 Polmar, Norman (2006). Aircraft Carriers: A History of Carrier Aviation and Its Influence on World Events, Volume I: 1909–1945. Lincoln, Nebraska, USA: Potomac Books, Inc. .

Aircraft Carrier squadrons of the Royal Navy
Military units and formations established in 1945
Military units and formations disestablished in 1945